The British Film Institute (BFI) is a charitable organisation established in 1933, based in the United Kingdom.  It has awarded its Fellowship title to individuals in "recognition of their outstanding contribution to film or television culture" and is considered the highest accolade presented by the Institute: British actor John Hurt said the award was "the highest honour possible".

The first awards were made in 1983, the same year as BFI National Archive's Silver Jubilee and the BFI's fiftieth anniversary, and as of February 2023, there are 91 Fellows.  Awards are not presented every year, but every award ceremony has been held in London, on occasion at the National Film Theatre as part of the BFI London Film Festival.  The inaugural ceremony honoured six recipients of the Fellowship: French film director Marcel Carné, British film directors David Lean, Michael Powell, Hungarian screenwriter Emeric Pressburger, Indian film-maker Satyajit Ray and American director and actor Orson Welles. The most recent Fellowship was bestowed in 2023 on American film director and screenwriter Spike Lee.

Following allegations of numerous sexual assaults and harassment allegations, American producer Harvey Weinstein was stripped of the fellowship that was originally awarded to him in 2002.

Of the 91 Fellows, the majority (60) are from the United Kingdom, with 31 foreign recipients, mainly from the United States and France.  There have been two African winners, both film directors, Malian Souleymane Cissé and Senegalese Ousmane Sembène while one recipient has come from each of Japan, India, Iran, Canada, and Australia.

Fellows

References

External links
BFI Fellowship homepage
BFI Fellowship award ceremonies

1983 establishments in the United Kingdom
Awards established in 1983
British film awards
Fellowships
Fellowship